Georges Mothron (born April 5, 1948 in Argenteuil) is a former member of the National Assembly of France.  He represented the Val-d'Oise department,  and is a member of the Republicans.

References

1948 births
Living people
People from Argenteuil
Rally for the Republic politicians
The Republicans (France) politicians
The Popular Right
Mayors of places in Île-de-France
Deputies of the 12th National Assembly of the French Fifth Republic
Deputies of the 13th National Assembly of the French Fifth Republic